Yuhina is a genus of birds in the white-eye family Zosteropidae.

The genus Yuhina was introduced in 1836 by the English naturalist Brian Houghton Hodgson with the stripe-throated yuhina as the type species. The genus name is from Nepali language. The genus was formerly placed in the family Timaliidae. It was moved to Zosteropidae based on results of molecular phylogenetic studies.

The genus contains the following seven species:
 Black-chinned yuhina (Yuhina nigrimenta)
 Taiwan yuhina (Yuhina brunneiceps)
 Whiskered yuhina (Yuhina flavicollis)
 Burmese yuhina (Yuhina humilis)
 White-naped yuhina (Yuhina bakeri)
 Stripe-throated yuhina (Yuhina gularis)
 Rufous-vented yuhina (Yuhina occipitalis)

The white-bellied erpornis (Erpornis zantholeuca) was formerly assigned to this genus, with the common name "white-bellied yuhina".

References

 
Bird genera
Taxonomy articles created by Polbot